The Hubbell Building is an historic structure located at 813-823 5th Avenue in San Diego's Gaslamp Quarter, in the U.S. state of California. It was built in 1886.

See also
 List of Gaslamp Quarter historic buildings
 List of San Diego Historic Landmarks

External links

 

1886 establishments in California
Buildings and structures completed in 1886
Buildings and structures in San Diego
Gaslamp Quarter, San Diego